The Iraqi M90 helmet was a military helmet, and was a locally produced version of the Iraqi M80 helmet which was purchased from South Korea. The Iraqi M90 was of lower quality than the M80, being made of plastic, but was issued in the Iraqi armed forces from 1990 until 2003. The Iraqi M90 helmet is sought by military collectors and is hard to find in good condition.

References 

Combat helmets of Iraq
Military equipment introduced in the 1990s